The Roman Catholic Archdiocese of Bamenda is the Metropolitan See of the Ecclesiastical province of Bamenda in Cameroon. It was by the Bull Tametsi Christianarum of 13 August 1970, that Pope Paul VI erected the Diocese of Bamenda with territory detached from the Diocese of Buea. On 18 March 1982 Pope John Paul II created, by the Bull Eo Magis Ecclesia Catholica, the Archdiocese of Bamenda, the Ecclesiastical Province of Bamenda and erected the Diocese of Kumbo with territory detached from the Diocese of Bamenda. Bamenda was by the same  bull made into the Metropolitan See of the Ecclesiastical Province with Buea and Kumbo as its Suffragans. Mamfe was later created into a diocese with territory detached from Buea. So Bamenda has 3 Suffragan Sees - Buea, Kumbo and Mamfe. As of Nov 2013 there are 35 Parishes in Bamenda divided into 6 Deaneries - NJINIKOM, MANKON, WIDIKUM, BAMBUI, WUM and NDOP.

History
 August 13, 1970: Established as Diocese of Bamenda from the Diocese of Buéa 
 March 18, 1982: Promoted as Metropolitan Archdiocese of Bamenda

Special churches
The seat of the archbishop is St. Joseph's Metropolitan Cathedral in Bamenda.
The oldest Parish of the archdiocese is St Anthony's Parish Njinikom,
Other significant parish Churches include St Matthias Widikum, St Patrick Babanki Tungo, St Martin de Porres, Wum, St Peter Bambui, and St Joseph Bafut. There is a Mater Redemptoris Shrine in Njangma, Mbatu in Njimafor Parish. Also the Centenary Shrine of the Immaculate Conception at Fujua in Fundong Parish where the first missionaries of the Sacred Heart of the Belgian Region settled in 1913.

Bishops

Ordinaries, in reverse chronological order
 Metropolitan Archbishops of Bamenda (Roman rite), below
 Archbishop Andrew Nkea Fuanya (since December 30, 2019)
 Archbishop Cornelius Fontem Esua (January 23, 2006 - December 30, 2019)
 Archbishop Paul Verdzekov (March 18, 1982 – January 23, 2006); see below
 Bishop of Bamenda (Roman rite), below
 Bishop Paul Verdzekov (August 13, 1970 – March 18, 1982); see above

Coadjutor archbishop
Cornelius Fontem Esua (2004-2006)

Auxiliary bishops
Agapitus Enuyehnyoh Nfon (2011-2016), appointed Bishop of Kumba
Michael Bibi (2017-2021), appointed Apostolic Administrator of Buéa on December 28, 2019, and later Bishop there

Suffragan Dioceses
Do not confuse Kumba and Kumbo.
 Buéa
 Kumba
 Kumbo
 Mamfe

Twinning

Since 1974 the diocese has been officially twinned with the Diocese of Portsmouth in England

Education
Sacred Heart College, Bamenda

See also
 Roman Catholicism in Cameroon

Sources
 - Fr Tatah Mbuy, Archdiocesan Director of Communication

References

Roman Catholic dioceses in Cameroon
Christian organizations established in 1970
Roman Catholic dioceses and prelatures established in the 20th century
1970 establishments in Cameroon
Bamenda
A